The Machines of the Isle of Nantes is an artistic, touristic and cultural project based in Nantes, France. The project is based in the old covered buildings of the former shipyards in Nantes that were at one time used for ship construction (les nefs), and later used as business sites.

Exhibits

The Great Elephant (2007) is a mechanical elephant,  and  meters wide, made from 45 tons of wood and steel. It can take up to 49 passengers for a 45-minute walk. It is an inexact replica of The Sultan's Elephant from Royal de Luxe, which toured the world from 2005 to 2007; the main difference being that this elephant is designed to carry spectators.

The Marine Worlds Carousel (2012) is a huge carousel, rising nearly 25m high and measuring 20m in diameter. It features 35 moving underwater creatures on three levels: the ocean floor, the depths, and sea and boats. Visitors will be able to move about amidst a ballet of aquatic animals and sea carriages, as well as climb aboard and guide the movements of the Machines.

The Heron Tree is an under-construction steel structure planned to be 50 meters in diameter and 30 meters in height, topped with two herons.  The project plans to allow visitors to climb either onto the back or onto the wings of the birds for a circular flight over the hanging gardens of the tree.

The Machine Gallery is an exhibition place to illustrate the background story of the machines.  Some visitors are invited to control marine animals or the European Flight Test Center. The entire process of the construction is on display by sketches, models and films.

References

External links

The Machines of the Isle of Nantes - Official website 
Nantes Metropole Tourism Office 
The Machines de l'Ile YouTube channel
Photographs of the machines and workshop
Slideshow : some pictures of the machines from the Carousel being built (2010)
 
 

French art
Nantes
Tourist attractions in Nantes
Squash venues